The 2008 Memorial Cup was played in May 2008 in Kitchener, Ontario at the Memorial Auditorium. It was the 90th annual Memorial Cup competition and determined the major junior ice hockey champion of the Canadian Hockey League (CHL).  Kitchener defeated competing bids from Oshawa, Saginaw, London, Sarnia and Kingston to host the Memorial Cup, with the official announcement being made on May 10, 2007. The tournament was competed between the WHL champion Spokane Chiefs, the QMJHL champion Gatineau Olympiques, the Kitchener Rangers as host of the tournament and OHL champions, and the OHL representative Belleville Bulls, who earned their place by reaching the OHL finals against Kitchener. The Memorial Cup tournament is a four team tournament with a round-robin format.

The tournament began on May 16, 2008, with a round-robin game between Gatineau and Kitchener and ended on May 25, 2008, with the Spokane Chiefs defeating the Kitchener Rangers 4–1 in the championship game to win the Memorial Cup. , this is the last Memorial Cup won by an American team; only Spokane (twice) and Portland (twice) have taken the Cup to the US.

A memorable moment of the tournament occurred immediately following the championship game. As Spokane Chiefs captain Chris Bruton was about to hand the trophy to teammate Trevor Glass, the cup detached from the base and fell to the ice. This was not the original Memorial Cup, which resides at the Hockey Hall of Fame, but a replica.

Round-robin standings

Rosters

Schedule
All times local (UTC -5)

Round Robin

Semi-final

Final

Leading scorers

Leading goaltenders
Goalies Have To Play A Minimum Of 60 Minutes To Be Listed.

Award winners
Stafford Smythe Memorial Trophy (MVP): Dustin Tokarski, Spokane
George Parsons Trophy (Sportsmanship): Matthew Halischuk, Kitchener
Hap Emms Memorial Trophy (Goaltender): Dustin Tokarski, Spokane
Ed Chynoweth Trophy (Leading Scorer): Justin Azevedo, Kitchener

All-star team
Goal: Dustin Tokarski, Spokane
Defence: Ben Shutron, Kitchener; Justin Falk, Spokane
Forwards: Justin Azevedo, Kitchener; Drayson Bowman, Spokane; Mitch Wahl, Spokane

Road to the cup

OHL Playoffs

QMJHL Playoffs

†Victoriaville seeded 8th in Eastern division.

WHL Playoffs

References

External links
 Memorial Cup
 Canadian Hockey League

Memorial Cup 2008
Memorial Cup 2008
Sport in Kitchener, Ontario
Mem